Krogh is a small lunar impact crater that is located in the eastern part of the Moon, to the southeast of the crater Auzout. It was named after Danish zoologist, physiologist and Nobel laureate August Krogh. This crater was previously designated Auzout B. The crater is roughly circular and bowl-shaped, with an inner wall that is wider in the north than the south. It is otherwise an undistinguished formation.

References

External links

 LTO-62B3 Krogh — L&PI topographic map

Impact craters on the Moon